Mutter (English: "Mother") is the third studio album by German Neue Deutsche Härte band Rammstein. It was released on 2 April 2001 through Motor and Universal Music. The album's cover image is a photograph of a dead fetus, which was taken by Daniel & Geo Fuchs. The album has yielded six singles which, to date, are the most released from any Rammstein album.

Writing and recording 
From September to December 1999, the band rented the house Weimar in Heiligendamm on the Baltic Sea for pre-production. The sound recordings took place in May and June 2000 at Studio Miraval in southern France. In advance of the album's release, Rammstein released the song "Links 2 3 4" on their website for download in December 2000. The single "Sonne" was released in January 2001.

Critical reception and legacy

In 2005, Mutter was ranked number 324 in Rock Hard magazine's book The 500 Greatest Rock & Metal Albums of All Time.

In a 2016 article published by uDiscover, Oran O'Beirne described the album as "one of the most important contemporary releases within heavy metal’s many subgenres."

In the interview with Noizr Zine, the well-known Swedish producer and musician Peter Tägtgren advised "Mutter" as a reference work for beginner producers: 
"I think, if you are not into death metal or something like that, but if you are into metal, I would say maybe Rammstein’s "Mutter" is very good, because it has a lot of different elements, it has orchestra parts, heavy guitars, good drum sound — that could be a good reference."

Track listing

There are various editions of Mutter, each with different features:
The Limited Tour Edition had the same cover, but red with the Rammstein logo embossed on the front. It also had a second CD with the following live tracks:
 "Ich will" – 3:57
 "Links 2 3 4" – 4:54
 "Sonne" – 4:42
 "Spieluhr" – 5:27
The Japanese edition had "Halleluja" as a hidden track, found after "Nebel" (there is a two-minute intermission of silence). The track was later included in the Resident Evil soundtrack, but does not appear in the film.
The limited edition had a second CD with just one track, "Halleluja", and a CD-ROM area featuring the "Sonne" video.  There is a spelling error on the back album track listing: it is listed as "Hallelujah" but the bonus CD itself has the song listed as "Halleluja", which is the correct spelling.
A 12" vinyl version and a MC version were released, with the same track list (Side A = 1–6; B = 7–11)
The Limited Tour Edition was also released as a double cassette set, with the second cassette containing the live tracks (Side A = 1–2; B = 3–4).
The Turkish cassette release of the album fades all songs out at 3:44.

Note: Some copies that have "Halleluja" as a hidden track can not be played for unknown reasons. On 3 April 2010 Rammstein posted a video with an official translation of "Halleluja" on their Facebook page, "in light of recent events".

Personnel

Rammstein
Till Lindemann – vocals
Richard Kruspe – lead guitar
Paul Landers – rhythm guitar
Christian Lorenz – keyboards
Oliver Riedel – bass
Christoph Schneider – drums

Guest musicians
Bobo – background vocals (track 11)
Khira Li Lindemann – vocals (track 7)
Olsen Involtini – string arrangements (tracks 1, 6, 11)
Orchestra parts by the Deutsches Filmorchester Babelsberg, conducted by Gunter Joseck

Production
Ulf Kruckenberg – engineer
Dirk Rudolph – sleeve design
Daniel & Geo Fuchs – photography

Charts

Weekly charts

Year-end charts

Certifications

References

2001 albums
Rammstein albums
German-language albums